Kibi may refer to:
 kibi (binary prefix), an ISO/IEC standard binary prefix for units of digital information
 Kibi District, Okayama (吉備郡; -gun), a district in Okayama Prefecture, Japan
 Kibi, Wakayama (吉備町), a town in District, Wakayama, Japan
 Kibi Province (吉備国), Japan,  in the area of Prefecture and eastern Hiroshima Prefectures
 Kingdom of Kibi (吉備), a kingdom of 4th century western Japan
 Kibi, Ghana
 Kibi, a tiny fish that makes part of the regional cuisine in Kagoshima, Japan
 Kibi Makibi (AKA Kibi Daijin), 8th-century Japanese scholar
 Karmapa International Buddhist Institute (KIBI)